The 2017 Super 8s were the third season of the Rugby Football League domestic competition in which the format of splitting teams after a certain number of games have been played.

The format was employed across all three divisions and was used to decide championships, promotion and relegation.

For the clubs in Super League XXII the split came after 23 games.  The top eight clubs  played each other once more before the top four team entered the playoffs for a place in the Super League Grand Final.  In this group, points amassed during the regular season were carried forward to the Super 8 stage.

The four teams finishing bottom of the Super League after 23 rounds went into a group of eight with the four teams who  finished top of the Championship.  Again the teams played each other once with the top three finishers after this stage plus the club who finished fifth (Catalans Dragons) playing in Super League XXIII while the other four will play in the 2018 Championship.  This group of eight was also known as the Qualifiers and was the only Super 8 group in which points amassed during the regular season were not carried forward to the group stage.

The other eight teams in the Championship competed for the Championship Shield with the top four going through to the Shield play-off semi-finals.  The two teams finishing bottom of this group were relegated to League 1.

In League 1 the top eight teams after the regular season of 15 games formed a group.  The format for 2017 has been varied slightly from previous years in that the team finishing top of this Super 8 group will automatically be promoted to the Championship with the next four teams going through to the play-off semi-finals. Previously the top two teams played in the League 1 Grand Final with the winner being promoted and the loser going into the play-off semi-finals with the teams finishing third, fourth and fifth.

The bottom eight teams in League 1 played each other for the League 1 Shield in a format identical to the Championship Shield except that there is no relegation from League 1.

Super League

Super 8's
 
The Super League Super 8s sees the top eight teams from the Super League play seven games each. Each team's points are carried over and after seven rounds the top four teams will contest the play off semi-finals with the team finishing first hosting the team in fourth, and the team finishing second hosting the third placed team; the winners of these semi-finals will contest the Super League Grand Final at Old Trafford.

Final standings

Play-offs

The Qualifiers

The Qualifiers Super 8s sees the bottom 4 teams from Super League table join the top 4 teams from the Championship. The points totals are reset to zero and each team plays seven games each, playing every other team once. After seven games each the teams finishing 1st, 2nd, and 3rd will gain qualification to the 2018 Super League season. The teams finishing 4th and 5th will play in the "Million Pound Game" at the home of the 4th place team which will earn the winner a place in Super League XXIII; the loser, along with teams finishing 6th, 7th and 8th, will be relegated to the Championship for 2018.

Round 1

Round 2

Round 3

Round 4

Round 5

Round 6

Round 7

Final standings

Million Pound Game

Championship Shield

At the end of the regular season the bottom 8 Championship teams play each other once more, home or away. The bottom two teams are then relegated to League 1 and the top four teams qualify for the play-offs for the Championship Shield.

Round 1

Round 2

Round 3

Round 4

Round 5

Round 6

Round 7

Final standings

Play-offs

League 1 Super 8s

The top eight teams in League 1 carry points forward and play each other once more home or away. After seven games the top team will be promoted to the Championship for 2018 while the teams finishing second to fifth will enter the playoffs.

Final standings

Play-offs

League 1 Shield

The bottom eight teams compete in the League 1 Shield where they play each other once more home or away. The top two teams compete for the League 1 Shield.

Standings

Final

References

2017 in English rugby league